Ophiocordyceps sinensis (formerly known as Cordyceps sinensis), known colloquially as caterpillar fungus, is an entomopathogenic fungus (a fungus that grows on insects) in the family Ophiocordycipitaceae. It is mainly found in the meadows above  on the Tibetan Plateau in Tibet and the Himalayan regions of Bhutan and Nepal. It parasitizes larvae of ghost moths and produces a fruiting body which used to be valued as a herbal remedy in traditional Chinese medicine. Caterpillar fungus contains the compound cordycepin, an adenosine derivative. However, the fruiting bodies harvested in nature usually contain high amounts of arsenic and other heavy metals, so they are potentially toxic and sales have been strictly regulated by the CFDA (China Food and Drug Administration) since 2016.

The fungus germinates in the living larva, kills and mummifies it, and then a dark brown stalk-like fruiting body which is a few centimeters long emerges from the corpse and stands upright.

O. sinensis is classified as a medicinal mushroom, and its use has a long history in traditional Chinese medicine as well as traditional Tibetan medicine. The hand-collected, intact fungus-caterpillar body is valued by herbalists as medicine, and because of its cost, its use is also a status symbol.

The fruiting bodies of the fungus are not yet cultivated commercially, but the mycelium form can be cultivated in vitro. Overharvesting and overexploitation have led to the classification of O. sinensis as an endangered species in China. Additional research needs to be carried out in order to understand its morphology and growth habits for conservation and optimum utilization.

Taxonomic history and systematics

Morphological features
Ophiocordyceps sinensis consists of two parts, a fungal endosclerotium (within the caterpillar) and stroma. The stroma is the upper fungal part and is dark brown or black, but can be a yellow color when fresh, and longer than the caterpillar itself, usually 4–10 cm. It grows singly from the larval head, and is clavate, sublanceolate or fusiform, and distinct from the stipe (stalk). The stipe is slender, glabrous, and longitudinally furrowed or ridged.

The fertile part of the stroma is the head. The head is granular because of the ostioles of the embedded perithecia. The perithecia are ordinally arranged and ovoid. The asci are cylindrical or slightly tapering at both ends, and may be straight or curved, with a capitate and hemispheroid apex, and may be two to four spored. Similarly, ascospores are hyaline, filiform, multiseptate at a length of 5–12 μm and subattenuated on both sides. Perithecial, ascus and ascospore characters in the fruiting bodies are the key identification characteristics of O. sinensis.

Ophiocordyceps (Petch) Kobayasi species produce whole ascospores and do not separate into part spores. This is different from other Cordyceps species, which produce either immersed or superficial perithecia perpendicular to stromal surface, and the ascospores at maturity are disarticulated into part spores. Generally Cordyceps species possess brightly colored and fleshy stromata, but O. sinensis has dark pigments and tough to pliant stromata, a typical characteristic feature of most of the Ophiocordyceps species.

Developments in classification
The species was first described scientifically by Miles Berkeley in 1843 as Sphaeria sinensis; Pier Andrea Saccardo transferred the species to the genus Cordyceps in 1878. The fungus was known as Cordyceps sinensis until 2007, when molecular analysis was used to amend the classification of the Cordycipitaceae and the Clavicipitaceae, resulting in the naming of a new family Ophiocordycipitaceae and the transfer of several Cordyceps species including C. sinensis to the genus Ophiocordyceps.

Common names
In Tibet it is known as yartsa gunbu,  ("summer grass winter worm"). The name was first recorded in the 15th century by the Tibetan doctor Zurkhar Namnyi Dorje. In colloquial Tibetan yartsa gunbu is often shortened to simply "bu" or "yartsa". The Tibetan name is transliterated in Nepali as यार्चागुन्बू, yarshagumba, yarchagumba or yarsagumba.

In traditional Chinese medicine, its name is often abbreviated as chong cao (蟲草 "insect plant"), a name that also applies to other Cordyceps species, such as C. militaris. In Japanese, it is known by the Japanese reading of the characters for the Chinese name, . Strangely, sometimes in Chinese English-language texts Cordyceps sinensis is referred to as aweto, which is the Māori name for Ophiocordyceps robertsii, a species from New Zealand.

The English term "vegetable caterpillar" is a misnomer, as no plant is involved. "Caterpillar fungus" is a preferred term.

Nomenclature of the anamorph
Since the 1980s, 22 species in 13 genera have been attributed to the anamorph (asexually reproducing mold-like form) of O. sinensis. Of the 22 species, Cephalosporium acreomonium is the zygomycetous species of Umbelopsis, Chrysosporium sinense has very low similarity in RAPD polymorphism, hence it is not the anamorph. Likewise, Cephalosporium dongchongxiacae, C. sp. sensu, Hirsutella sinensis and H. hepiali and Synnematium sinnense are synonymous and only H. sinensis is only validly published in articles. Cephalosporium sinensis possibly might be synonymous to H. sinensis but there is lack of valid information. Isaria farinosa is combined to Paecilomyces farinosus and is not the anamorph. Several isolates of Isaria sp., Verticella sp., Scydalium sp. and Stachybotrys sp. were identified only up to generic level, and it is dubious that they are anamorph. Mortierella hepiali is discarded as anamorph as it belongs to Zygomycota. Paecilomyces sinensis and Sporothrix insectorum are discarded based on the molecular evidence. P. lingi appeared only in one article and thus is discarded because of incomplete information. Tolypocladium sinense, P. hepiali, and Scydalium hepiali, have no valid information and thus are not considered as anamorph to Ophiocordyceps sinensis. V. sinensis is not considered anamorph as there is no valid published information. Similarly, Metarhizium anisopliae is not considered anamorph as it has widely distributed host range, and is not restricted only in high altitude.

Thus Hirsutella sinensis is considered the validly published anamorph of O. sinensis, Cordyceps nepalensis and C. multiaxialis which had similar morphological characteristics to O. sinensis, also had almost identical or identical ITS sequences and its presumed anamorph, H. sinensis. This also confirms H. sinensis to be anamorph of O. sinensis and suggests C. nepalensis and C. multiaxialis are synonyms. Evidence based on microcyclic conidiation from ascospores and molecular studies support H. sinensis as the anamorph of the caterpillar fungus, O. sinensis.

Ecology and life cycle

The fungus is reported from the northern range of Nepal, Bhutan, and also from the northern states of India, apart from northern Yunnan, eastern Qinghai, eastern Tibet, western Sichuan, southwestern Gansu provinces. Fifty-seven taxa from several genera (37 Thitarodes, 1 Bipectilus, 1 Endoclita, 1 Gazoryctra, 3 Pharmacis, and 14 others not correctly identified to genus) are recognized as potential hosts of O. sinensis.

The stalk-like dark brown to black fruiting body (or mushroom) grows out of the head of the dead caterpillar and emerges from the soil in alpine meadows by early spring. During late summer, the fruiting body disperses spores. The caterpillars, which live underground feeding on roots, are most vulnerable to the fungus after shedding their skin, during late summer. In late autumn, chemicals on the skin of the caterpillar interact with the fungal spores and release the fungal mycelia, which then infects the caterpillar.

The infected larvae tend to remain underground vertical to the soil surface with their heads up.  After invading a host larva, the fungus ramifies throughout the host and eventually kills it. Gradually the host larvae become rigid because of the production of fungal sclerotia. Fungal sclerotia are multihyphal structures that can remain dormant and then germinate to produce spores. After overwintering, the fungus ruptures the host body, forming the fruiting body, a sexual sporulating structure (a perithecial stroma) from the larval head that is connected to the sclerotia (dead larva) below ground and grows upward to emerge from the soil to complete the cycle.

The slow growing O. sinensis grows at a comparatively low temperature, i.e., below 21 °C. Temperature requirements and growth rates are crucial factors that distinguish O. sinensis from other similar fungi. Climate change is suspected to be negatively affecting the mountain organism.

Use in traditional Asian medicines 

The use of caterpillar fungus as folk medicine apparently originated in Tibet and Nepal. So far the oldest known text documenting its use was written in the late 15th century by the Tibetan doctor Zurkhar Nyamnyi Dorje [1439–1475]) in his text:  ("Instructions on a Myriad of Medicines"), where he describes its use as an aphrodisiac.

The first mention of Ophiocordyceps sinensis in traditional Chinese medicine was in Wang Ang’s 1694 compendium of materia medica, Ben Cao Bei Yao. In the 18th century it was listed in Wu Yiluo's Ben cao cong xin ("New compilation of materia medica"). The ethno-mycological knowledge on caterpillar fungus among the Nepalese people is documented. The entire fungus-caterpillar combination is hand-collected for medicinal use.

In traditional Chinese medicine, it is regarded as having an excellent balance of yin and yang as it is considered to be composed of both an animal and a vegetable. They are now cultivated on an industrial scale for their use in traditional Chinese medicine. However, no one has succeeded so far in rearing the fungus by infecting cultivated caterpillars; all products derived from cultured Ophiocordyceps are derived from mycelia grown on grains or in liquids.

The compound cordycepin, a derivative of the nucleoside adenosine, is found in caterpillar fungus as well as other Cordyceps species. Cordycepin has several potential medicinal and therapeutic applications, it has also displayed cytotoxicity against some leukemic cells in vitro. At least one clinical trial of cordycepin as a leukemia treatment is in progress.

Economics and impact
In rural Tibet, yartsa gunbu has become the most important source of cash income. The fungi contributed 40% of the annual cash income to local households and 8.5% to the GDP in 2004.   Prices have increased continuously, especially since the late 1990s. In 2008, one kilogram traded for US$3,000 (lowest quality) to over US$18,000 (best quality, largest larvae). The annual production on the Tibetan Plateau was estimated in 2009 at 80–175 tons. The Himalayan Ophiocordyceps production might not exceed a few tons.

In 2004 the value of a kilogram of caterpillars was estimated at 30,000 to 60,000 Nepali rupees in Nepal, and about Rs 100,000 in India. In 2011 the value of a kilogram of caterpillars was estimated at 350,000 to 450,000 Nepali rupees in Nepal. A 2012 BBC article indicated that in north Indian villages a single fungus was worth Rs 150 (about £2 or $3), which is more than the daily wage of a manual labourer. In 2012, a pound of top-quality yartsa had reached retail prices of $50,000.

The price of Ophiocordyceps sinensis is reported to have increased dramatically on the Tibetan Plateau, about 900% between 1998 and 2008, an annual average of over 20% (after inflation). However, the value of large caterpillar fungus has increased more dramatically than small Cordyceps, regarded as lower quality.

Because of its high value, inter-village conflicts over access to its grassland habitats has become a headache for the local governing bodies and in several cases people were killed. In November 2011, a court in Nepal convicted 19 villagers over the murder of a group of farmers during a fight over the prized aphrodisiac fungus. Seven farmers were killed in the remote northern district of Manang in June 2009 after going to forage for Yarchagumba.

Its value gave it a role in the Nepalese Civil War, as the Nepalese Maoists and government forces fought for control of the lucrative export trade during the June–July harvest season. Collecting yarchagumba in Nepal had only been legalised in 2001, and now demand is highest in countries such as China, Thailand, Vietnam, Korea and Japan. By 2002, the 'herb' was valued at R 105,000 ($1,435) per kilogram, allowing the government to charge a royalty of R 20,000 ($280) per kilogram.

The search for Ophiocordyceps sinensis is often perceived to threaten the environment of the Tibetan Plateau where it grows. While it has been collected for centuries and is still common in such areas, current collection rates are much higher than in historical times.

In the Kingdom of Bhutan Ophiocordyceps sinensis is recently also being harvested. The quality of the Bhutanese variety has been shown to be equal to the Tibetan one.

Cultivated O. sinensis mycelium is an alternative to wild-harvested O. sinensis, and producers claim it may offer improved consistency. Artificial culture of O. sinensis is typically by growth of pure mycelia in liquid culture (in China) or on grains (in the West).

See also
List of fungi by conservation status

References

Further reading
Winkler, D. 2005. Yartsa Gunbu – Cordyceps sinensis. Economy, Ecology & Ethno-mycology of a Fungus Endemic to the Tibetan Plateau. In: A. BOESI & F. CARDI (eds.). Wildlife and plants in traditional and modern Tibet: Conceptions, Exploitation and Conservation. Memorie della Società Italiana di Scienze Naturali e del Museo Civico di Storia Naturale di Milano, Vol. 33.1:69–85.

External links

Yartsa Gunbu (Cordyceps sinensis) in Tibet
An Electronic Monograph of Cordyceps and Related Fungi 
Cordyceps information from Drugs.com
Cordyceps sinensis (Berk.) Sacc. Medicinal Plant Images Database (School of Chinese Medicine, Hong Kong Baptist University)  
Tibet’s Golden "Worm" August 2012 National Geographic (magazine)
Friday Fellow: Ophiocordyceps sinensis at Earthling Nature

Fungi described in 1843
Fungi of Asia
Ophiocordycipitaceae
Medicinal fungi
Fungi used in traditional Chinese medicine
Taxa named by Miles Joseph Berkeley
Parasitic fungi